Vitaly Grigorievich Khlopin (Russian:Вита́лий Григо́рьевич Хло́пин) (January 1890 - 10 July 1950) was a Russian and Soviet scientist- radiochemist, professor, academician of the USSR Academy of Sciences (1939), Hero of Socialist Labour (1949), and director of the Radium Institute of the USSR Academy of Sciences (1939-1950).)

One of the founders of Soviet radiochemistry and radium industry; received the first domestic radium preparations (1921); one of the founders of the Radium Institute and leading participants in the atomic project , founder of the school of Soviet radiochemists.

References
 

Soviet chemists
1890 births
1950 deaths

Nuclear chemists
Full Members of the USSR Academy of Sciences